The 2020–21 Liga Femenina de Baloncesto, also known as Liga Femenina Endesa for sponsorship reasons, was the 58th season of the Spanish basketball women's league. It started on 19 September 2020 with the first round of the regular season and ended on 6 May 2021 with the finals.

It was the following season after the 2019–20 season was curtailed in response to the COVID-19 pandemic. Consequently, there were not relegations to Liga Femenina 2 and the league was expanded to 16 teams for this season.

Format changes 
For this season, the league was expanded to 16 teams and the first two rounds of the playoffs will be played in a two-legged tie, instead of previous seasons best-of-three playoff that are kept for the finals.

Teams

Promotion and relegation (pre-season) 
A total of 16 teams consisted the league, including the same 14 sides from the 2019–20 season and two promoted from the 2019–20 Liga Femenina 2.

Teams promoted from Liga Femenina 2
Movistar Estudiantes
Snatt's Femení Sant Adrià (resigned due to economical reasons and swapped place with Spar Gran Canaria)

Other changes 
The professional team of Stadium Casablanca was integrated into Basket Zaragoza's structure to become its women's team. It played with its colours, name and crest.

Venues and locations

Regular season

League table

Positions by round 
The table lists the positions of teams after completion of each round. In order to preserve chronological evolvements, any postponed matches are not included in the round at which they were originally scheduled, but added to the full round they were played immediately afterwards.

Results

Playoffs 

Source: FEB

Final standings

Awards 
All official awards of the 2020–21 Liga Femenina de Baloncesto.

MVP 

Source:

National MVP 

Source:

All–League Team 

Source:

Best Young Player Award 

Source:

Best Coach 

Source:

Player of the round

Regular season

Quarter-finals

Semi-finals

Final

Spanish clubs in international competitions

References

External links 
 Official website 

Fem
Liga Femenina de Baloncesto seasons
Spain